Wat Mongkolratanaram is a Buddhist Thai temple on the bank of the Palm River in Tampa, Florida. It was initiated in 1981 as well as dedicated and registered as a temple on 19 May 1981. The visions of the Thai Temple include to be a center for meditation study and practice, a center of Thai Cultural and Asian cultural practice, a school for Thai language and Buddhism study, a center of communication and support between Thais living aboard and Thai government officers, and a center for all denomination international religious support group.

The temple's grounds are a sanctuary of calm for those who seek peace.  Its Sunday food market is well known for its reasonable and delicious Thai ethnic food and as a place to spend with family and friends.

History 
In 1981, Phramongkolthep Moli (Supot Chotipalo), assistant abbot of Wat Suthat Thepwararam, Priest 3 came to meet with Buddhists from various cities in Florida, and jointly agreed to build the first temple in Tampa, Florida, where many Thai Buddhists live. A temple was established according to the laws of the state of Florida named 'Wat Mongkolratanaram of Florida Inc., Thai Buddhist Temple, Interbay Area Florida" on 19 May 1981 and is a temple No. 8 under the Thai Sangha Assembly in the United States 

The present main prayer hall had its groundbreaking and was built in 2007; the statue of the Buddha in the new prayer hall was named and anointed by His Majesty King Bhumibol Adulyadej on 8 April 1980.

Objectives   
The objectives of the establishment of the temple were
 To establish a school of meditation
 To establish a Thai and Asian Cultural Center
 To set up a Thai language school center and Sunday Buddhism
 To be the center of connection between Thai people and Thai government officials in the United States and foreigners
 To be an international religious center

Religious Practice 
 Arrange for a translation evening Vipassana meditation training to the general public Every Sunday from 1:00 PM to 3:00 PM all year round.
 Organize training to teach Vipassana meditation to foreigners English section every important festival
 In the festival of Buddhist Lent ordination ceremony every Saturday – Sunday (Instead of the day of the Uposatha precepts) and there are sermons. Every Sunday for three months
 Publish a journal News Send to members of the temple every festival
 Free distribution of Dharma books in both Thai and English throughout the year
 Important religious days such as Makha Bucha Day, Visakha Bucha Day, Asanha Bucha Day Organized a merit-making ceremony, offering food to monks, candlelight vigils, dharma performances, and ordination with at least 700 participants.

References

Asian-American culture in Florida
Buddhism in Florida
Religious buildings and structures in Tampa, Florida
Thai-American culture
Buddhist temples in Florida
Overseas Thai Buddhist temples